Ricardo Surrador Vasconcelos (born 27 October 1997) is a Portuguese-South African cricketer. 

He made his first-class debut for Boland in the 2016–17 Sunfoil 3-Day Cup on 10 November 2016. He made his List A debut for Boland in the 2016–17 CSA Provincial One-Day Challenge on 13 November 2016. He made his Twenty20 debut for Boland in the 2017 Africa T20 Cup on 15 September 2017.

In March 2018, he was signed by Northamptonshire ahead of the English cricket season. He holds a Portuguese passport, making him eligible to play domestic cricket in England.

On 26 March 2022, he was appointed as club captain in first-class cricket, having previously led the List A team during the 2021 season. He resigned during the season and was replaced by Will Young.

References

External links
 

1997 births
Living people
Boland cricketers
Northamptonshire cricketers
Portuguese cricketers 
South African cricketers
Northamptonshire cricket captains 
Cricketers from Johannesburg
South African emigrants to Portugal
South African people of Portuguese descent